Buie House is a historic house in Natchez, Mississippi, USA. It was built circa 1855. It has been listed on the National Register of Historic Places since July 13, 1983.

References

Houses on the National Register of Historic Places in Mississippi
Greek Revival houses in Mississippi
Houses completed in 1855
Antebellum architecture
Houses in Adams County, Mississippi